The Peabody Gazette-Bulletin is a local weekly newspaper for the cities of Peabody, Burns, Florence in the state of Kansas.  The paper publishes every Wednesday.  The newspaper also maintains an online presence.

History
The Peabody Gazette newspaper was founded in 1873 by J.P. Church.  There was a daily edition in 1887 by W.H. Morgan, but it went back to a weekly edition during the same year.  The Peabody Graphic newspaper existed from May 20 to June 19 of 1891.  The Peabody Herald newspaper was founded in 1911 by C.T. Weaver.  The Gazette and Herald consolidated into the Peabody Gazette-Herald in 1915 by Oscar S. Stauffer.

Notable editors
 Oscar Stanley Stauffer (1886-1982), founder of Stauffer Communications, editor of Peabody Gazette-Herald newspaper from 1915 to 1922.

See also

The other newspapers in Marion County are Hillsboro Free Press, Hillsboro Star-Journal, Marion County Record.

References

External links
 
 Peabody Newspaper Archive, 1876 to 2017.
 1916 History of Early Marion County Newspapers

Weekly newspapers published in the United States
Newspapers published in Kansas
Marion County, Kansas